Lorna Golding (née Charles) is the wife of the 8th Prime Minister of Jamaica, Bruce Golding. Lorna Golding, is sister of retired JLP MP, Minister, and Speaker of the House Pearnel Charles. She completed school at New York Business Institute and worked at the office of British and Africa Affairs and the United Kingdom and Supply delegation, a subsidiary of the British Consulate. She later worked for the NAACP (National Association for the Advancement of Coloured People) and with the Sierra Leone Mission to the United Nations. Her career has included working in Early Childhood Education - Building a Better Jamaica.

References

Living people
Spouses of prime ministers of Jamaica
Alumni of Mico University College
NAACP activists
Year of birth missing (living people)